Clarissa Belnap Dixon (born Clara Belnap Dixon; November 30, 1851 – May 15, 1916) was an American bohemian, anarchist philosopher, labor activist, feminist and poet who lived at various times in Iowa, New York City, Kansas, and California. She was the mother of avant-garde composer Henry Cowell.

Early life

Childhood
Clara Belnap Dixon was born on November 30, 1851, in Hennepin, Illinois, a small town on the Illinois River about forty miles north of Bloomington, to woodworker Samuel Asenath Dixon and Bethshua Dixon (née Nash). The family's ancestry was of mostly Scotch and Irish descent, but Samuel's lineage was partially English and had been in America for centuries, with figures including astronomer Jeremiah Dixon, one of the surveyors behind the American Mason–Dixon line.

Clarissa was the second of five children born to Samuel and Bethshua. The family moved at some point, to let all the children to attend free public school and church in the small village of Amityville, near Eddyville, Iowa. The area was an unassuming Midwestern plains farming community some forty miles southeast of Des Moines, which suited the young couple's rural sensibilities. She was raised in a strict fundamentalist christian household.

Frustrated by her parent's beliefs, she left the town at age seventeen and relocated to the nearby city of Kirkville in Wapello County. It was there where she met George Davidson, a young farmhand. They were wed in 1869 and had their only son, Clarence, little more than a year later in 1871. At the same time, Clarissa decided to seek a thorough education at the age of nineteen, and attended a private school in nearby Ottumwa. She later became one of the six teachers in all of Eddyville, working for around eight years largely in small, one-room country schools.

Early activism
As a young woman, Clarissa regularly attended labor movement, communist, and anarchist gatherings in Chicago. Using a toy typesetting device, she produced a political leaflet, functioning as an unsalaried specialist and representative regarding labor reform and women's suffrage for local newspapers. Her devotion to these reforms led her to voluntarily write for these publications – such as The Chicago Sentinel, The American Nonconformist, and The Iowa Farmers' Tribune — papers that circulated widely but didn't pay their writers.

As early as 1883, Dixon's politically charged essays and manifestos were attracting both praise and scorn from around the country. She was being solicited by papers and magazines from the nation's largest cities, though her popularity mainly rest among the more impoverished communities of the northern Midwest.

Settling in California

Burgeoning career
Urging to escape the Midwest and its fundamentalist atmosphere, she took the train alone to San Francisco in 1890, a city with a then-lively colony of unconventional writers. Clarissa, it has been suggested, may have been specifically drawn to the bohemianism of the literary community, but it's unknown precisely which aspects of the city and California more broadly appealed to her. From 1889 to 1891 she was the assistant editor of an anarchist weekly, The Beacon. Dixon's friendships during this period included the writers Jack London, George Sterling and Ambrose Bierce.

While in San Francisco, she teamed up with a young Irish immigrant, Harry Cowell, to found the fortnightly anarchist paper, Enfant Terrible. She used this opportunity to provide a more unfiltered and strong-willed disposition. Her style of writing and use of propaganda is exemplified in one of Enfant Terrible'''s first 1891 publications: The clergyman has no more right than the clown to marry people. The judge has no more right than the jail-bird to sentence people. The policeman has no more right than the pauper to arrest people. The tax collector has no more right than any other thief to filch people's property. The legislator has no more right than the lackey to make laws. I have no reverence for God, nor parents, nor sovereigns, nor presidents, nor popes, nor bishops, nor dead bodies, nor ancient institutions; in short, I have no reverence for any person or thing. As well as in a 1892 article from the New York journal Liberty:The State uses money robbed from the parents to perpetuate its powers of robbery by instructing their children in its own interest. The church also, uses its power to perpetuate its power. And to these twin leeches... are the tender minds of babies entrusted for education.

She released her only published book in 1909, the LGBT feminist novel Janet and Her Dear Phebe, which The New York Times characterized at the time as, "a very intense sort of a love story in which the lovers are two little girls who are devoted to each other with that fervency known only to feminine childhood".

Dixon and Cowell would marry in 1893.

Later life
Raising Henry
Dixon's second child, Henry Dixon Cowell, was born in 1896, at which point she was forty-six years old. In 1914, Dixon began a typescript manuscript of biographical details of her son's early life, which she completed before her death from breast cancer in 1916, at age 64.

Footnotes

References
Citations

Sources
 
 
 Dixon, Clarissa Belnap (1909). Janet and Her Dear Phebe''. Frederick A. Stokes.

External links
Frog Peak Music online edition of Janet and Her Dear Phebe

1850s births
1916 deaths
19th-century American educators
19th-century American poets
19th-century American women
19th-century American women writers
20th-century American women writers
Activists from California
Activists from Illinois
Activists from Indiana
Activists from Iowa
American anarchists
American feminists
American feminist writers
American memoirists
American people of English descent
American people of Irish descent
American people of Scottish descent
American poets
American political writers
American socialists
American women's rights activists
American women writers
Deaths from breast cancer
Deaths from cancer in California
American LGBT rights activists
People from Hennepin, Illinois
People from Menlo Park, California
People from San Francisco
Poets from California
Progressivism in the United States